= Judith Littleton =

New Zealander anthropologist

- Born: Judith Helen Littleton
- Education: Australian National University
- Scientific career
- Fields: Anthropology
- Workplaces: University of Auckland
- Thesis: A delicious torment : an analysis of dental pathology on historic Bahrain (2011)

Judith Helen Littleton is a New Zealand anthropology academic, and as of 2018 is a full professor at the University of Auckland.

== Academic career ==
After a 2011 PhD titled 'A delicious torment : an analysis of dental pathology on historic Bahrain' at The Australian National University, Littleton moved to the University of Auckland, rising to full professor.

== Selected works ==
- Littleton, Judith, and Bruno Frohlich. "Fish‐eaters and farmers: dental pathology in the Arabian Gulf." American Journal of Physical Anthropology 92, no. 4 (1993): 427–447.
- Littleton, Judith, and Harry Allen. "Hunter-gatherer burials and the creation of persistent places in southeastern Australia." Journal of Anthropological Archaeology 26, no. 2 (2007): 283–298.
- Wilbur, Alicia K., A. W. Farnbach, K. J. Knudson, Jane E. Buikstra, Bernardo Arriaza, Deborah Blom, Piers D. Mitchell et al. "Diet, tuberculosis, and the paleopathological record." Current Anthropology 49, no. 6 (2008): 963–991.
- Littleton, Judith. "Fifty years of chimpanzee demography at Taronga Park Zoo." American Journal of Primatology: Official Journal of the American Society of Primatologists 67, no. 3 (2005): 281–298.
- Littleton, Judith, Julie Park, Craig Thornley, Anneka Anderson, and Jody Lawrence. "Migrants and tuberculosis: analysing epidemiological data with ethnography." Australian and New Zealand journal of public health 32, no. 2 (2008): 142–149.
